Blue Steel is a 1934 American pre-Code Monogram Western film directed by Robert N. Bradbury and starring John Wayne. Wayne plays a U.S. Marshal who is trying to capture the Polka Dot Bandit, who has taken off with $4,000. The film also featured Yakima Canutt and George "Gabby" Hayes. It was released as Stolen Goods in the UK, and this version was later released in a colorized version on home video. Since the movie has fallen into the public domain, several versions are in circulation, including a colorized edition with a jarringly re-dubbed soundtrack, including dialogue, music and sound effects.

Plot

John Carruthers is an undercover US Marshal. He appears to be in town investigating a string of robberies committed by the Polka Dot Bandit, but when he is a little late in discovering one of the Bandit's thefts, Sheriff Jake thinks Carruthers is the thief. For some reason, instead of arresting him, Jake accompanies him on his journey; after all, as Carruthers says, "It's kind of lonesome trailing alone."

The two stumble upon a gang robbing a pack-mule train; they rescue Betty Mason, whose father has just been killed by the bandits. She and her father were bringing desperately needed provisions to town, but the bandits have successfully cut off any supplies, forcing the townspeople to consider fleeing their homes or starving to death.

It turns out that the local rich man, Malgrove, is behind the robberies. He knows there's a vein of gold underneath the homesteaders' property, and he offers out of the kindness of his heart to purchase their land for a pittance. When the grieving Betty overhears his plans, Malgrove and his henchmen kidnap her. Carruthers and Jake offer to make one last attempt to bring supplies in, and Malgrove and his henchmen make plans to murder them.

Cast

See also
 John Wayne filmography
 List of American films of 1934

References

External links

 
 
 

American black-and-white films
1934 films
Films directed by Robert N. Bradbury
1934 Western (genre) films
Monogram Pictures films
American Western (genre) films
1930s English-language films
1930s American films